Shakespeare by the Sea  may refer to:
 Shakespeare by the Sea, Halifax
 Shakespeare by the Sea, Newfoundland
 Shakespeare by the Sea (Australia)
 Shakespeare by the Sea, Los Angeles